37655 Illapa, provisional designation , is a carbonaceous asteroid, classified as near-Earth object and potentially hazardous asteroid of the Apollo group, approximately 1.5 kilometers in diameter. It was discovered, on 1 August 1994, by American astronomer couple Carolyn and Eugene Shoemaker at the Palomar Observatory in California, United States.

Orbit and classification 

Physical characteristics 

Illapa has an estimated diameter of 0.8 to 1.8 kilometers for an assumed geometric albedo between 0.20 and 0.04. For an assumed albedo of 0.057, which is typical for carbonaceous C-type asteroids, and an absolute magnitude of 17.9, the asteroid has a calculated mean-diameter of 1.5 kilometers. The body has a short rotation period of 2.6556 hours.

Naming 

This minor planet was named after Illapa (Apu Illapu), the thunder or weather god from Inca mythology.

References

External links 
 
 
 

037655
Discoveries by Eugene Merle Shoemaker
Discoveries by Carolyn S. Shoemaker
Named minor planets
037655
19940801